S-charl is a village in the municipality of Scuol, located in the canton of Graubünden, Switzerland. The village lies in the Engadin region, at 1,810 metres in the Val S-charl south of Scuol, in the Sesvenna Range (Swiss Alps).

External links 
Description of S-charl on Schweizmobil.ch

Villages in Graubünden
Scuol